Sachiko Hirayama (born January 3, 1971 in Shizuoka Prefecture, Japan) is a Japanese politician who has served as a member of the House of Councillors of Japan since 2016. She represents the Shizuoka at-large district and is an Independent. 

She is a member of the following committees (as of 2021):

 Committee on Environment

References 

Living people
1971 births
21st-century Japanese politicians
21st-century Japanese women politicians
Members of the House of Councillors (Japan)
Politicians from Shizuoka Prefecture